Chaiwat "Tob" Thongsaeng (in ) born in Thailand on 18 April 1989 (Thai year 2532) is a Thai film actor and model and is best known for his lead role in the film Bangkok Love Story as Iht (Brick).

Chaiwat Tongseang graduated from Rittiyawannalai School, continuing at Sripatum University's Faculty of Arts specializing in Communications Art.

Award nominations
In 2008, he was nominated for Best Supporting Actor at the Thailand National Film Association Awards for his role in the film Bangkok Love Story

Filmography
2007: Haunting Me as Main
2007: Bangkok Love Story as Iht (Stone)
Others
2007: เหยิน เป๋ เหล่ เซมากูเตะ
2010: บางระจัน ภาค 2
2011: หอแต๋วแตกแหวกชิมิ

In popular culture
Chaiwat Thongsaeng has appeared in a number of popular advertisements and fashion and lifestyle magazine covers (Volume, Stage and others)
In 2008, he took part in bodybuilding competitions
He represented Thailand in Mister International 2010.

References

External links

Chaiwat Thongsaeng
Chaiwat Thongsaeng
Living people
1989 births